Friedrich Heinrich Helmut Fritsche (January 2, 1932 - 2008) was a German agronomist and politician.

Life 
He was born in 1932 as the first son of the farmer Friedrich Fritz Fritsche and his wife Marta Fritsche née Möser. He studied and made a diploma as agricultural engineer. He spend much time of his life being an environmentalist. From 1990 to 1999 he was the municipal fire chief and from 1990 unto his death city councillor.

For his merits he awarded the Order of Merit of the Free State of Thuringia by Minister-President Dieter Althaus in 2004.

References 

1932 births
2008 deaths
Christian Democratic Union of Germany politicians
German Lutherans
20th-century Lutherans